Hans Günter Winkler (24 July 1926 – 9 July 2018) was a German show jumper. He is the only show jumper to have won five Olympic gold medals and a total of seven Olympic medals, and to compete and win medals in six different Olympic Games. In the 1950s and 1960s Winkler was one of Germany's most popular athletes.

Career 
Winkler was born in Barmen, today part of Wuppertal, North Rhine-Westphalia, Germany, the son of a riding teacher. His father, Paul Winkler, died as a soldier during the last week of World War II. The boy was drafted as a Flakhelfer and was a prisoner of war for a short time. The house of his mother in Frankfurt was destroyed by bombing. He made money, to support his mother and himself, as a groom in the stable of the Landgravine of Hesse in Kronberg im Taunus. He was also a riding teacher of the Americans who occupied the area. He began an apprenticeship in a textile store in Frankfurt in 1948.

Winkler participated in show jumping competitions and won for the first time on 10 October 1948, in Hünfeld, on Falkner. A new Olympic Committee for Riding (DOKR) was founded in 1949 by Gustav Rau, who moved it to Warendorf. He called Winkler to join in 1950. In the morning, Winkler trained horses for the committee, in the afternoon he worked as a carpenter. 

Halla was a horse that the committee intended for eventing. Rau found her unsuitable for the task and called her owner and breeder Gustav Vierling in Darmstadt to take her back. Vierling came and asked Winkler to take care of the mare, which he accepted. The mare became an important part of his equestrian career.

Winkler won his first German championship in 1952, but could not participate in the Olympic Games in Helsinki that year because he was classified as a professional due to his teaching in the 1940s. Winkler won the World Championship with Halla in 1954, again in 1955, and became one of the favorites for the 1956 Olympic Games. In 1956 the Equestrian Games were held in Stockholm, as the athletes and their horses were not allowed to travel to Melbourne due to quarantine restrictions. In the first round Winkler pulled a groin muscle at the penultimate obstacle after his mare took off early and threw him out of position. 

Despite the pain Winkler decided to ride in the second round as the German team would be eliminated without him. After he was given tranquilizers Winkler found that he was comfortable sitting, but riding was difficult and painful. Any drugs that could reduce the pain enough to make him comfortable in the saddle also would reduce his mental capacity, and therefore, he was only given black coffee before his ride to try to help reduce his dizziness and double-vision. Halla apparently sensed that her rider was not right and performed the entire course clear with only steering from Winkler, and their performance won them the individual and team gold.

Winkler won five gold medals in jumping (in addition to the four individual medals with the German team) between 1956 and 1976, as well as a silver medal and a bronze medal. He is one of the most successful German Olympic athletes, third only to Isabell Werth and Reiner Klimke for gold medals produced in German equestrian competition. He was German Sportspersonality of the Year in 1955 and 1956. Winkler retired from jumping on 13 July 1986 with the conclusion of the Aachen tournament. Winkler worked as a trainer for the German Olympic teams, along with Paul Schockemöhle and Herbert Mayer, leading them to success in Seoul in 1988. He consulted companies who wanted to sponsor equestrian sport, organized tournaments, and worked for the development of young riders.

He later published numerous books on riding and in 1991 founded the HGW-Marketinggesellschaft, a sports marketing firm that has helped produce various equestrian competitions. He was also a member of the German Equestrian Federation's Jumping Committee and helped to select the 2000 Olympic Team for Germany. The German Equestrian Federation announced his death in Warendorf on 9 July 2018.

Awards 
He also received the media prize Bambi Award.

Major achievements 
Olympic Games
 1956 Stockholm: Team gold medal and individual gold medal on Halla
 1960 Rome: Team gold medal. Individually finished 5th on Halla
 1964 Tokyo: Team gold medal. Individually finished 16th on Fidelitas
 1968 Mexico City: Team bronze medal, individually finished 5th on Enigk
 1972 Munich: Team gold medal on Torphy
 1976 Montreal: Team silver medal, individually finished 10th on Torphy
 World championships
 1954 Madrid: Individual gold medal on Halla
 1955 Aachen: Individual gold medal on Halla/Orient

See also
List of athletes with the most appearances at Olympic Games
List of multiple Olympic gold medalists in one event
List of multiple Olympic gold medalists

Publications

Literature 
 Bryant, Jennifer O. Olympic Equestrian, A Century of International Horse Sport. Lexington, KY: Blood-Horse Publications, 2008
 Ludwig, Dieter: Hans Günter Winkler. – Warendorf : FN-Verl., 1983. – 
 Schröter, Eckhard F.: The happiest place on earth. The life and career of German riders.. Fischer-Taschenbuch-Verlag, Frankfurt a. M. 1980,

References

External links 

 
 Hans Günter Winkler  hall-of-fame-sport.de
 Kim Kreling: Where are they Now? Hans Gunter Winkler horse-canada.com
 Hans-Günter Winkler – an Olympic Jockey olympics30.com
 Hans Günter Winkler olympic.org

1926 births
2018 deaths
German male equestrians
German show jumping riders
Knights Commander of the Order of Merit of the Federal Republic of Germany
Olympic equestrians of the United Team of Germany
Olympic equestrians of West Germany
Olympic gold medalists for the United Team of Germany
Olympic gold medalists for West Germany
Olympic silver medalists for West Germany
Olympic bronze medalists for West Germany
Equestrians at the 1956 Summer Olympics
Equestrians at the 1960 Summer Olympics
Equestrians at the 1964 Summer Olympics
Equestrians at the 1968 Summer Olympics
Equestrians at the 1972 Summer Olympics
Equestrians at the 1976 Summer Olympics
Olympic medalists in equestrian
Medalists at the 1976 Summer Olympics
Medalists at the 1972 Summer Olympics
Medalists at the 1968 Summer Olympics
Medalists at the 1964 Summer Olympics
Medalists at the 1960 Summer Olympics
Medalists at the 1956 Summer Olympics
Sportspeople from Wuppertal
Luftwaffenhelfer
German prisoners of war in World War II